is a Japanese ice hockey player for Daishin Hockey and the Japanese national team.

She represented Japan at the 2019 IIHF Women's World Championship. She represented Japan at the 2023 Winter World University Games, winning a silver medal.

References

External links

2000 births
Living people
Japanese women's ice hockey defencemen
Sportspeople from Hokkaido
Universiade medalists in ice hockey
Medalists at the 2023 Winter World University Games
Universiade silver medalists for Japan